Cosmophyllum is a genus of bush crickets in the subfamily Phaneropterinae. Species are found in Chile.

The name was also given to a genus of prehistoric hexacorals by E Vollbrecht in 1922 which was turned into a synonym for Arcophyllum, itself being turned into a subgenus of Mesophyllum.

References

External links 

 
 Cosmophyllum at insectoid.info
 Cosmophyllum at orthoptera.speciesfile.org

Phaneropterinae
Tettigoniidae genera